Karen Knowles (born 4 March 1964) is an Australian singer-songwriter and record producer, and former television personality.

Biography

1975-1980s: Early career
Knowles was educated in Melbourne at the Methodist Ladies' College. She became nationally famous on the popular television program Young Talent Time, and was a member of the Young Talent Team from 1975 to 1980. Knowles first appeared as a contestant on Young Talent Time in 1974 whilst attending Donvale Primary School east of Melbourne.

In 1980, she signed with Fable Records and became the first Australian schoolgirl to receive a Gold record with her Top Ten single "Why Won't You Explain" in 1981. Her first album You Are The Reason was certified platinum in 1982.

Her second album, Loves Us All, was also released in 1982. In 1983, her third album The Third Time was released and she had a Top 30 single "You Don't Know Love" in 1984. In 1984 Knowles left the Fable label and moved to London.

1988-2000: Return to Australia
Knowles returned to Australia in 1988 and featured in the stage musical Big River during its eighteen-month national tour. For her performance as southern belle, Mary Jane Wilks, Knowles received a nomination for a Green Room Award for Best Supporting Actress in a Musical.

In 1990 Knowles joined The Seekers. In 1991, Knowles, along with the group's main songwriter Bruce Woodley and the National Boys Choir, recorded the song I Am Australian.

In 1991 Knowles recorded and produced her fourth album A Night of Carols, featuring the Australian Girls Choir. In 1992, Knowles traveled to the United States to record Moonglow, her fifth album.

During 1997 Knowles wrote and performed a new musical composition at the Aboriginal Reconciliation Convention. In 1998, Knowles was appointed as one of the Inaugural Ambassadors for Reconciliation by the Council for Aboriginal Reconciliation. Also in 1998, she was nominated for an Australian Humanitarian Award for her Services to the Arts.

In 1999 Knowles recorded and released her sixth album By Request, a compilation of some her most requested songs.

Discography

Studio albums

Compilation albums

Singles

Awards and nominations

TV Week / Countdown Awards
Countdown was an Australian pop music TV series on national broadcaster ABC-TV from 1974–1987, it presented music awards from 1979–1987, initially in conjunction with magazine TV Week. The TV Week / Countdown Awards were a combination of popular-voted and peer-voted awards.

|-
| 1980
| Herself
| Best New Talent
| 
|-

References

External links
 Official website
 It Takes Two website
 Young Talent Time fan tribute site
 Karen Knowles' discography
 Wiilpa

1964 births
Living people
Australian television actresses
Australian women songwriters
Singers from Melbourne
People educated at Methodist Ladies' College, Melbourne
20th-century Australian women singers